Luart is an unincorporated community located along old U.S. Route 421 in the Upper Little River Township of Harnett County, North Carolina, United States, situated between Mamers and the town of Lillington . It is a part of the Dunn Micropolitan Area, which is also a part of the greater Raleigh–Durham–Cary Combined Statistical Area (CSA) as defined by the United States Census Bureau.

References
 

Unincorporated communities in Harnett County, North Carolina
Unincorporated communities in North Carolina